"It's Showtime!!" is the thirty-fourth single by B'z, released on March 26, 2003. This song is one of B'z many number-one singles in Oricon charts.

Track listing 
It's Showtime!! - 4:00
New Message - 3:57

Certifications

References 
B'z performance at Oricon

External links 
 

2003 singles
B'z songs
Oricon Weekly number-one singles
Songs written by Tak Matsumoto
Songs written by Koshi Inaba
Songs about music
Songs about theatre